Sueviota pyrios, the fiery dwarfgoby, is a species of fish in the family Gobiidae..This species reaches a length of .

Distribution
The fish is found in the Eastern Indian Ocean, the Red Sea, the Gulf of Aqaba, and offshore of Israel.

References

pyrios
Taxa named by David Wayne Greenfield
Taxa named by John Ernest Randall
Fish described in 2017